Demirler can refer to:

 Demirler, Büyükorhan
 Demirler, Gerede